Pablo Alejandro Marini (born 31 January 1967)  is an Argentine football manager and former player who played as a forward.

Career
Born in Santa Fe, Argentina, Marini played professional football from 1987 to 2002, scoring 154 goals. He began his career with the youth side of Newell's Old Boys. He played senior football for Instituto, Central Córdoba, Argentino de Rosario, FC Basel, Nueva Chicago, Douglas Haig, Arsenal de Sarandí, San Martín de San Juan, Tivoli Calcio, Fernández Vial.

After he retired from playing, Marini became a football coach. He managed Chiapas and Pachuca in Mexico, and Audax Italiano in Chile. He joined Pachuca as manager in August 2010 to replace Guillermo Rivarola and had previously been the manager of Newell's Old Boys. He was the manager of Pachuca for the 2010 FIFA Club World Cup in the United Arab Emirates.

Managerial statistics

Managerial statistics

Notes

References

External links

1967 births
Living people
Footballers from Santa Fe, Argentina
Argentine footballers
Argentine expatriate footballers
Argentine football managers
Argentine expatriate football managers
Instituto footballers
Central Córdoba de Rosario footballers
Argentino de Rosario footballers
Nueva Chicago footballers
Club Atlético Douglas Haig players
Arsenal de Sarandí footballers
San Martín de San Juan footballers
S.S.D. Tivoli Calcio 1919 players
C.D. Arturo Fernández Vial footballers
Juventud Unida Universitario players
Argentine Primera División players
Primera B Metropolitana players
Primera Nacional players
Serie D players
Primera B de Chile players
Torneo Argentino A players
Newell's Old Boys managers
Audax Italiano managers
Chiapas F.C. managers
C.F. Pachuca managers
Atlante F.C. managers
Mineros de Zacatecas managers
Club Puebla managers
C.D. Veracruz managers
Atlético Morelia managers
Unión de Santa Fe managers
Montevideo City Torque managers
L.D.U. Quito managers
Deportes La Serena managers
Argentine Primera División managers
Chilean Primera División managers
Liga MX managers
Uruguayan Primera División managers
Expatriate footballers in Italy
Expatriate footballers in Chile
Expatriate football managers in Chile
Expatriate football managers in Mexico
Expatriate football managers in Uruguay
Expatriate football managers in Ecuador
Argentine expatriate sportspeople in Italy
Argentine expatriate sportspeople in Chile
Argentine expatriate sportspeople in Mexico
Argentine expatriate sportspeople in Uruguay
Argentine expatriate sportspeople in Ecuador
Association football forwards